IC 5152 is an irregular galaxy 5.8 million light-years from Earth in the constellation Indus. It was discovered by DeLisle Stewart in 1908. It is an open question as to whether it is an outlying member of the Local Group. It is one of the easiest galaxies to resolve into stars, but there is a bright (magnitude 7.7) foreground star (HD 209142) right in front of it that makes deep observations difficult.

References

External links
 
 

Irregular galaxies
Local Group
Field galaxies
5152
67908
Indus (constellation)
Astronomical objects discovered in 1908